Sam Vanni (till 1941 Samuel Besprosvanni; 6 July 1908 – 20 October 1992) was a Finnish painter. He is considered to be the pioneer of abstract art in Finland.

Samuel Besprosvanni was born in Vyborg. His parents were fur trader Aron Besprosvanni and Rakel Stoler. Besprosvanni was multi-lingual since his early childhood. Of Jewish origin, his home language was Yiddish, but he went to a Swedish school and most of his friends were speaking Finnish. The Besprosvanni family moved to Helsinki in 1921 and in 1927 Samuel started studies in the Academy of Fine Arts. Later he studied in the Accademia di Belle Arti in Florence and was a private student of the sculptor Wäinö Aaltonen. In 1931 his works were displayed in an annual Finnish Art Society exhibition.

From 1938 to 1939 Vanni lived in London and Paris, where he attended the Académie Julian and Académie de la Grande Chaumière. In the 1940s Vanni started to move towards more abstract art. He was especially influenced by French artists like Henri Matisse and Pierre Bonnard. Sam Vanni was an active painter until his death in 1992. He was awarded by the Pro Finlandia and invited in the Academy of Finland in 1964.

References 

1908 births
1992 deaths
Artists from Vyborg
People from Viipuri Province (Grand Duchy of Finland)
Finnish Jews
Jewish painters
Académie Julian alumni
Finnish people of Russian-Jewish descent
20th-century Finnish painters